Pacific Premier Bancorp, Inc. is a registered holding company under the Bank Holding Company Act of 1956 headquartered in Irvine, California, US. Its principal business focuses on Pacific Premier Bank, which offers a range of financial services to individuals, businesses, and professionals. The bank operates numerous branches in California, Arizona, Nevada, and Washington. Pacific Premier Bank offers commercial escrow services and facilitates 1031 Exchange transactions through its Commerce Escrow division.

History
Pacific Premier Bank was originated from Life Bank and founded in 1983.

In 1991, the bank became a federally chartered stock savings bank.

In 1997 Pacific Premier Bancorp, Inc. was formed as a banking holding company.

In 2006, new depository branches were formed in Costa Mesa, Huntington Beach, and Los Alamitos.

In 2007, the bank became a California-chartered commercial bank.

In 2011, Pacific Premier Bank completed the acquisition of Canyon National Bank.

On April 27, 2012, the Company completed the acquisition of Palm Desert National Bank.

On March 15, 2013, the company acquired First Associations Bank, a Texas-chartered bank headquartered in Dallas, Texas.

On June 25, 2013, Pacific Premier Bancorp Inc. acquired San Diego Trust Bank.

On November 18, 2013, the company acquired Infinity Franchise Holdings with a price estimated to be approximately $16 million.

In October 2014, Pacific Premier Bancorp Inc. bought Independence Bank, located in Newport Beach, for $71.5 million. 

In April 2017, the company bought Heritage Oaks Bancorp.

In 2018, it acquired the holding company of Grandpoint Bank Grandpoint Capital, Regents Bank, and the Biltmore Bank of Arizona with approximately $3.2 billion in total assets. Pacific Premier Bank was named at the top of the list of Top Performing Regional Banks by S&P Global Market Intelligence in the same year.

In 2019, Forbes ranked Pacific Premier Bank at number 11 in its list of America’s Best Banks.

In 2020, the company was ranked number 3 in the list of America’s Best Banks by Forbes. Pacific Premier Bank bought Opus Bank with approximately $8 billion in total assets, along with its divisions PENSCO Trust Company (now Pacific Premier Trust) and Commerce Escrow.

In 2021, It was ranked Top Public US Bank by S&P Global Market Intelligence and remained at number 3 in the list of America’s Best Banks by Forbes.

Leadership
The main leaders of the company in 2022:
M. Christian Mitchell - Lead Director
Steve Gardner -  Chairman, President & CEO
Edward Wilcox - President & COO
Ronald Nicolas - CFO

Sponsorship 
Pacific Premier Bank has been a sponsor of the Los Angeles Chargers since 2017.

References

External links

Companies listed on the Nasdaq
1997 establishments in the United States
American companies established in 1997
Banks established in 1997
Holding companies established in 1997
Banks based in California
Financial services companies of the United States